The Office of the Controller General of Accounts (হিসাব মহানিয়ন্ত্রক)  is an autonomous government agency responsible for compilation and consolidation of government accounts. It is headquartered in Dhaka, Bangladesh.

History
The Office of the Controller General of Accounts was established in 1985 through an office memo of the Finance Division under the Ministry of Finance. Before then it was known as the Office of the Accountant General which was established in 1947. It monitors the collection of taxes by the National Board of Revenue. According to a study by Transparency International Bangladesh there were 23 specific incidents of corruption in the Office of the Controller General of Accounts. The Office of the Controller General of Accounts sometimes collaborates with the Office of the Comptroller and Auditor General of Bangladesh.

References

Government departments of Bangladesh
Government agencies of Bangladesh
1985 establishments in Bangladesh
Organisations based in Dhaka